Kobzarivka is a village in Ternopil Raion, Ternopil Oblast (province) of western Ukraine. It was formerly known as Zaruddia. Kobzarivka belongs to Ternopil urban hromada, one of the hromadas of Ukraine.

History
The first written mention is in 1463.

In 1963 the villages of Zaruddia and Obaryntsi were united under the name of Kobzarivka - in honor of Taras Shevchenko.

There is a church of St. Apostle John the Theologian (1906, brick; reconstructed in 2003). The church has been preserved (1910, destroyed during the First World War; rebuilt in 1919).

Near the village there is a botanical natural heritage site Kobzarivska Zozulyntseva area.

Until 18 July 2020, Kobzarivka belonged to Zboriv Raion. The raion was abolished in July 2020 as part of the administrative reform of Ukraine, which reduced the number of raions of Ternopil Oblast to three. The area of Zboriv Raion was merged into Ternopil Raion.

Population
Population in 2003: 405 inhabitants.
Population in 2014: 324 inhabitants with over 167 houses.

They were born in Kobzarivka:
doctor Ihor Dziubanovskyi (b. 1947),
General Director of ternopil radio plant "Orion", scientist Yaroslav Karpyk (b. 1951).

Studied at Kobzarivka school:
poet and scientist Oleh Herman (b. 1948),
local historian, literary critic Havrylo Chernykhivskyi (1936–2011)

References

Notes

Sources

External links

Ternopil urban hromada
Villages in Ternopil Raion